The Law of the Four Just Men is a 1921 thriller novel by the British writer Edgar Wallace. It was the fourth in a series of stories featuring The Four Just Men, a group of vigilante crime fighters.

References

Bibliography
 Victor E. Neuburg. The Batsford Companion to Popular Literature. Batsford Academic and Educational, 1982.

1921 British novels
Novels by Edgar Wallace
British thriller novels